Ipinda is an administrative ward in the Kyela district of the Mbeya Region of Tanzania. In 2016 the Tanzania National Bureau of Statistics report there were 5,626 people in the ward, from 8,081 in 2012.

Villages / vitongoji 
The ward has 4 villages and 9 vitongoji.

 Konjula
 Kipela
 Njugilo
 Maendeleo
 Kikole "A"
 Kikole "B"
 Mbula
 Bugoba
 Ilindi
 Njugilo
 Kasama A
 Kasama B
 Malangali

References 

Wards of Mbeya Region